Senator Schenck may refer to:

Abraham V. Schenck (1821–1902), New Jersey State Senate
Abraham Schenck (New York senator) (fl. 1790s), New York State Senate
John I. Schenck (1787–1833), New York State Senate
William Cortenus Schenck (1773–1821), Ohio State Senate